Sandaru Chanditha Wickramaratne (born 26 May 2000) is a Sri Lankan cricketer. He made his List A debut on 23 December 2019, for Kandy Customs Cricket Club in the 2019–20 Invitation Limited Over Tournament. He made his Twenty20 debut on 14 January 2020, for Kandy Customs Cricket Club in the 2019–20 SLC Twenty20 Tournament.

References

External links
 

2000 births
Living people
Sri Lankan cricketers
Kandy Customs Sports Club cricketers
Place of birth missing (living people)